The 2022 Africa Women's Sevens are an annual African rugby sevens tournament that took place at the Stade Municipal de Jemmal in Jemmal on 29 and 30 April 2022; they were held in Tunisia for the fourth time.

Nine teams participated in the tournament, including 2019 champions South Africa (who successfully defended their title and qualified for the 2022 Commonwealth Games in Birmingham). Since South Africa already qualify for the 2022 Rugby World Cup Sevens as hosts, Madagascar secured the World Cup ticket to Cape Town by finishing as runners-up.

Format
Teams are divided into three pools, in which they each play two matches. Based on their pool positions and points differences, the lowest-ranked team overall is eliminated and the remaining teams seeded in the knockout-stage Cup quarter-finals.

Quarter-final winners advance to the Cup semi-finals (and final / third-place match beyond those), whilst the losers contest the lower-classification Plate matches.

Teams 
The following teams participated in the tournament:

Pool stage
All times in West Africa Time (UTC+01:00)
Pool A

Pool B

Pool C

Ninth-place elimination
Senegal, the lowest-ranked team overall, does not progress to the knockout stage.

Knockout stage

Plate competition (5th–8th place playoffs)

Cup competition

Final standings

Note

See also
 2021–22 World Rugby Women's Sevens Series

References

External links
 Tournament site

 

2022
2022 rugby sevens competitions
2022 in African rugby union
2022 in Tunisian sport
2022 in women's rugby union
April 2022 sports events in Africa
Africa Women's Sevens